Magnolia is a city in southwestern Montgomery County, Texas, United States within the Houston–The Woodlands–Sugar Land metropolitan area. It is named for the magnolia trees that grow in the area. The population was 2,359 at the 2020 United States Census.

Geography

According to the United States Census Bureau, the city has a total area of  all of which is land.

History
The first settlement in the Magnolia area was a town named Mink Prairie, founded in about 1845 when a farmer named Mink built a homestead. By 1850, the town's name was shortened to Mink. After the Civil War, Mink's population swelled due to an influx of settlers from Kentucky and Tennessee, resulting in a post office being built in 1885. In 1902, the International-Great Northern Railroad (now operated by Union Pacific), decided to build a railroad to the north of Mink, causing most of the residents of Mink to move closer to the railroad line. The new town was named Melton in honor of a wealthy landowner who lived in the area. However, the postal service kept confusing the name with a different town called "Milton," prompting local officials to change the name to Magnolia. In 1903, the Mink post office moved to the new town of Magnolia, as the old town of Mink would soon become abandoned.

Demographics

As of the 2020 United States census, there were 2,359 people, 939 households, and 678 families residing in the city.

As of the census of 2010, there were 1,393 people, 529 households, and 365 families residing in the city. The racial makeup of the city was 81.3% White, 10.3% African American, 0.5% Native American, 0.8% Asian, 5.7% from other races, and 1.3% from two or more races. Hispanic or Latino of any race were 11.7% of the population.

There were 529 households, out of which 49.9% had children under the age of 18 living with them, 44.9% were married couples living together, 18.5% had a female householder with no husband present, and 31.0% were non-families. 25.7% of all households were made up of individuals. The average household size was 2.63 and the average family size was 3.16.

In the city, the population was spread out, with 29.7% under the age of 19, 5.9% from 20 to 24, 24.6% from 25 to 44, 26.3% from 45 to 64, and 13.6% who were 65 years of age or older. The median age was 37.8 years. For every 100 females, there were 91.0 males. For every 100 females age 18 and over, there were 86.3 males.

According to the 2015 American Community Survey, the median income for a household in the city was $43,594, and the median income for a family was $61,250. Males had a median income of $26,938 versus $20,490 for females. The per capita income for the city was $26,752. About 16.4% of families and 15.9% of the population were below the poverty line, including 28.5% of those under age 18 and 3.9% of those age 65 or over.

Government and infrastructure

Local government
As an incorporated city with a population of less than 5000, Magnolia is designated as a general law city under the Constitution of Texas. It is governed at the local level by an elected mayor and five council members. As of January 2023, the mayor is Todd Kana. Council member Richard Carby also serves as mayor pro tem. The other council members are Daniel Miller, Matthew "Doc" Dantzer, Brenda Hoppe, and Jack L Huitt, Jr.

In 2011 the citizenry voted to allow the sale of alcoholic beverages. Magnolia was the last "dry" city in Montgomery County.

City of Magnolia Comprehensive Plan

On April 9, 2013, the Magnolia City Council adopted a 20-year comprehensive plan entitled, "Magnolia on the Move." In the plan, the city outlines its vision for dealing with the projected business and residential growth in the area. The plan starts by identifying distinctive land use types that exist throughout the city and surrounding area:
Rural
Parks and Urban Space
Residential Estate
Suburban Residential
Semi-Urban Residential/Neighborhood Conservation
Neighborhood Conservation Mixed
Suburban Village
Auto-Urban Commercial
Magnolia Town Center and Unity Plaza
Business Park
Industrial
Public/Institutional

Each of these types is given defined boundaries within Magnolia and the projected growth areas around Magnolia. The city plans to develop each type in a different way to preserve the character of these distinctive areas. As Magnolia expands its city limits and extraterritorial jurisdiction through annexation, it plans to carefully manage the growth of these areas to conform with the land types designated above.

In 2015, the city adopted a Unified Development Code (UDC) to outline the specific steps development should take to comply with the comprehensive plan. The UDC includes specific restrictions on development within each of the land use types, including restrictions on the height of signs, the materials used to construct buildings, and the protection of live oak and magnolia trees.

State government
In the Texas Senate, Magnolia is part of District 4, represented by Republican Brandon Creighton. In the Texas House of Representatives, Magnolia is part of District 3, represented by Cecil Bell Jr.

Federal government
In the United States Senate, Republicans John Cornyn and Ted Cruz represent the entire state of Texas. In the United States House of Representatives, Magnolia is part of District 8, represented by Republican Kevin Brady.

The United States Postal Service Magnolia Post Office is located at 815 Goodson Road.

Transportation
Magnolia is located at the intersection of FM 1488 and FM 1774.

FM 1488 connects Magnolia to Interstate 45 to the east in between Conroe and The Woodlands. Its western terminus is Hempstead.

FM 1774, also known as Magnolia Boulevard to the south, becomes SH 249 in Pinehurst a few miles north of Tomball. SH 249 continues into Houston. To the north of Magnolia, FM 1774 travels to the Texas Renaissance Festival in Todd Mission.

Education

Public schools 

The city of Magnolia is part of the Magnolia Independent School District. 
 Students in grades K–5 attend either Magnolia Elementary or Williams Elementary.
 Students in 6th grade attend Magnolia 6th Grade Campus.
 Students in grades 7–8 attend Magnolia Junior High.
 Students in grades 9–12 attend either Magnolia High School or Magnolia West High School. Limited numbers of students may also attend the ALPHA Academy, an alternative high school.

Private schools 

Concordia Lutheran High School (9–12) is a private school in Tomball near Magnolia. Other private schools in the greater Tomball-Magnolia area include Rosehill Christian School (K–12), St. Anne Catholic School (Pre-K–8), Salem Lutheran School, Cypress Christian School (K–12), and Great Oak School a Waldorf School (Pre-K–8).

St. Anne Catholic, established in 1984, originally held its classes at St. Anne Church; that year it had 16 Kindergarten students and 13 first grade students. It had had 380 students in 2015. That year Joseph Noonan became the principal.

Cypress Christian School, established in 1978, originally held its classes at Cypress Bible Church. It now has over 650 students. In 2018, Dr. Jeffery Potts joined CCS as Head of School. Dr. Potts was on the news for creating a School Marshall Program, where he armed teachers with guns at his previous school.

Colleges and universities 

The Texas Legislature designates Magnolia ISD (and therefore all of Magnolia) as a part of Lone Star College (originally the North Harris Montgomery Community College District). The territory in Splendora ISD joined the community college district in 2000.

Public libraries 

The Montgomery County Memorial Library System operates the Malcom Purvis Branch in the city.

Climate

The climate in this area is characterized by hot, humid summers and generally mild to cool winters. According to the Köppen Climate Classification system, Magnolia has a humid subtropical climate, abbreviated "Cfa" on climate maps.

Notable people 

 Cecil Bell Jr., Republican member of the Texas House of Representatives, District 3
 Buddy Dial, NFL wide receiver for Pittsburgh Steelers and Dallas Cowboys, played college football for Rice University
 Michael Galloway, Republican member of the Texas Senate representing District 4
 Marcus Luttrell, United States Navy war hero; depicted in Lone Survivor depict his service along with other military heroes in Operation Red Wings
 Morgan Luttrell, Republican member-elect of the United States House of Representatives, District 8
 Nick Mitchell, wrestler for WWE
 Amanda Scarborough, is an American sports broadcaster for ESPN and former softball player at Texas A&M

Notes

References

External links

 Magnolia, Texas

Cities in Texas
Cities in Montgomery County, Texas
Greater Houston
Year of establishment missing